Mikayla Carolyn Hinkley (born 1 May 1998) is an Australian cricketer who plays as a right-handed batter and occasional right-arm off break bowler for Queensland Fire in the Women's National Cricket League (WNCL) and Brisbane Heat in the Women's Big Bash League (WBBL). She previously played for New South Wales Breakers, making her debut in 2016, before joining Queensland ahead of the 2019–20 WNCL season. In the WBBL, she has previously played two seasons for the Sydney Thunder, and one season each for playing for Perth Scorchers and Hobart Hurricanes. She is the first WBBL player to play for 4 clubs since the league's inception in 2015.

Hinkley has indigenous heritage and identifies as a member of the Kunja people. In November 2018, she was selected as part of the first female Indigenous Sydney Thunder team. In the same month, she was named in the Women's Global Development Squad, to play fixtures against WBBL clubs.

References

External links

Mikayla Hinkley at Cricket Australia

1998 births
Australian women cricketers
Cricketers from Sydney
Indigenous Australian cricketers
Living people
Brisbane Heat (WBBL) cricketers
Hobart Hurricanes (WBBL) cricketers
New South Wales Breakers cricketers
Queensland Fire cricketers
Perth Scorchers (WBBL) cricketers
Sportswomen from New South Wales
Sydney Thunder (WBBL) cricketers